The 2018 Pan American Men's Club Handball Championship was the XI and last edition of this tournament, held in Taubaté, Brazil from 23 to 27 May 2018. It acted as a qualifying tournament for the 2018 IHF Super Globe.

Participating teams

 SAG Villa Ballester
 Ferro Carril Oeste
 Handebol Taubaté
 EC Pinheiros
 Handebol Londrina
 Alberta Team Handball
 Ovalle Balonmano

Modus 
The seven teams played in two groups a round Robin.

The last from Group A and the two last from Group B played a Consolation round.

The first from each group played against the second from the other group the Semifinals.

The losers of the semis played Third place game and the winners the Final.

Preliminary round

Group A

All times are local (UTC–3).

Group B

Consolation round

Knockout stage

Bracket

Semifinals

Third place game

Final

Final standing

References

External links
Pan American Handball Confederation website

Pan American Men's Club Handball Championship
Pan American Men's Club Handball Championship
P
May 2018 sports events in South America